Montechiari is a village in Tuscany, central Italy, administratively a frazione of the comune of Palaia, province of Pisa.

Montechiari is about 40 km from Pisa and 9 km from Palaia.

References

Bibliography 

Frazioni of the Province of Pisa